The 2020 Greek Basketball Super Cup is the 1st edition of the revived Greek professional domestic basketball super cup competition, under the auspices of the Hellenic Basketball Clubs Association (HEBA), and the 2nd overall. The Greek Basketball Super Cup had been played only once before, in 1986, under the auspices of the Hellenic Basketball Federation (E.O.K.). 

Promitheas Patras won the 2020 Super Cup.

Format
The competition will be played on a final-four format and single elimination games, between the teams placed in the four first places of the 2019–20 Greek Basket League, which include the 2019–20 Greek Basketball Cup winner and finalist.

Qualified Teams
The following four teams qualified for the tournament.

Bracket

References

External links
 Official Hellenic Basketball Federation Site 
 Official Greek Basket League Site 

Greek Basketball Super Cup
2019–20 in Greek basketball